Presidential elections were held in the Republic of Serbia on Sunday, 13 June 2004. As no candidate received a majority of the vote, a second round was held on Sunday, 27 June. Boris Tadić, the pro-western Democratic Party's candidate, was the eventual victor with 54% of the vote.

Candidates
Boris Tadić, Democratic Party (advanced to second round)
Tomislav Nikolić, Serbian Radical Party (advanced to second round)

Dragan Maršićanin, Democratic Party of Serbia
Bogoljub Karić, Strength of Serbia Movement
Ivica Dačić, Socialist Party of Serbia
Princess Elizabeth of Yugoslavia
Vladan Batić, Democratic Christian Party of Serbia
Borislav Pelević, Party of Serbian Unity
Branislav Ivković, Socialist People's Party
Zoran Milinković, Patriots of Serbian Diaspora
Marijan Rističević, People's Peasant Party
Ljiljana Aranđelović, United Serbia
Dragan Đorđević, Party of Serbian Citizens
Milovan Drecun, Serbian Revival
Mirko Jović, People's Radical Party

The surprise of this election was the success shown by one of the wealthiest businessmen in Serbia, Bogoljub Karić. The Government's candidate, Dragan Maršićanin, finished in 4th place, which opened the question of new parliamentary elections in Serbia.

In the second round, the democratic candidate Boris Tadić gained the support of every government party as well as of Bogoljub Karić.

Results

References

External links
Serbian Electoral Commission
Centre for Free Elections and Democracy

Presidential elections in Serbia
Serbia
Elections in Serbia and Montenegro
Serbia
Presidential